Con Conrad (born Conrad K. Dober, June 18, 1891 – September 28, 1938) was an American songwriter and producer.

Biography

Conrad was born in Manhattan, New York, and published his first song, "Down in Dear Old New Orleans", in 1912.  Conrad produced the Broadway show The Honeymoon Express, starring Al Jolson, in 1913.  By 1918, Conrad was writing and publishing with Henry Waterson (1873–1933).  He co-composed "Margie" in 1920 with J. Russel Robinson and lyricist Benny Davis, which became his first major hit. He went on to compose hits that became standards, including:

 "Palesteena" with co-composer and co-lyricist J. Russel Robinson (1920)
 "Singin' the Blues" with co-composer J. Russel Robinson and lyricists Sam M. Lewis and Joe Young (1920)
 "You've Got to See Mama Ev'ry Night" with co-composer and co-lyricist Billy Rose (1923)
 "Come on Spark Plug" with co-composer and co-lyricist Billy Rose (1923)
 "Barney Google" with co-composer and co-lyricist Billy Rose (1923)
 "Memory Lane" with lyricist Buddy DeSylva and co-composer Larry Spier (1924)
 "Lonesome and Sorry" with lyricist Benny Davis (1926)
 "Ma! He's Making Eyes at Me" with lyricist Sidney Clare (1928)

In 1923, Conrad focused on the stage and wrote the scores for the Broadway shows:  The Greenwich Village Follies, Moonlight, Betty Lee, Kitty’s Kisses and Americana.
In 1924 the Longacre Theatre staged the small musical Moonlight, with a score by Conrad and William B. Friedlander. The next year Conrad and Friedlander's Mercenary Mary was presented at the Longacre.
In 1929, Conrad moved to Hollywood after losing all of his money on unsuccessful shows.  There he worked on films such as:  Fox Movietone Follies, Palmy Days, The Gay Divorcee and Here’s to Romance.

Conrad received the first Academy Award for Best Song for The Continental in 1934 along with collaborator Herb Magidson. He died four years later in Van Nuys, California.

His spouse was actress Francine Larrimore. He died in Van Nuys, California, aged 47.

Conrad was posthumously inducted into the Songwriters Hall of Fame in 1970.

Notes

External links
 

Sheet Music for "Margie", Waterson, Berlin & Snyder Co., 1920.
 Con Conrad recordings at the Discography of American Historical Recordings.

1891 births
1938 deaths
Songwriters from New York (state)
Best Original Song Academy Award-winning songwriters
20th-century American musicians
Record producers from New York (state)